Alex Lawson (born January 31, 1994) is an American tennis player who specializes in doubles.

Lawson has a career-high ATP doubles ranking of world No. 101 achieved on 25 July 2022 and a singles ranking of world No. 1373 achieved on 15 August 2022.

He has reached 28 career doubles finals posting a record of 8 wins and 22 losses, which includes a 4–12 record in ATP Challenger finals. He won the 2018 Granby Challenger alongside Chinese player Zhe Li, the 2019 Gatineau Challenger with Aussie Marc Polmans, the 2021 Cleveland Open and the Segovia Challenger pairing up with compatriot Robert Galloway.

Lawson made his ATP main draw debut at the 2016 Hall of Fame Tennis Championships on grass courts in Newport, USA where he was given a wildcard entry into the main doubles draw alongside compatriot Mackenzie McDonald. They were defeated in the first round in two tie-break sets by British brother duo Neal Skupski and Ken Skupski 6–7(4–7), 6–7(7–9).

ATP Challenger and ITF Futures finals

Doubles: 30 (8–22)

References

External links
 
 
 

1994 births
Living people
American male tennis players
Tennis people from Arizona
Notre Dame Fighting Irish men's tennis players
20th-century American people
21st-century American people